The following is a list of notable buildings in the Gothic Revival style.

Argentina 
 Cathedral of Bariloche
 Cathedral of La Plata
 Cathedral of Luján
 Cathedral of Mar del Plata

Australia 

 Scots' Church, Melbourne
 Vaucluse House Sydney Regency Gothic.
 Sydney Conservatorium of Music, the old Government stable block.
 Government House, Sydney
 St. Andrew's Cathedral, Sydney
 St. Mary's Cathedral, Sydney
 Sydney University, the main building, commenced 1850s, extended 20th century
 St Patrick's Cathedral, Melbourne
 St. Paul's Cathedral, Melbourne
 Melbourne University – Main Building, Newman College and Ormond College
 The Collins Street group in Melbourne – Rialto buildings, Former Stock Exchange, Gothic Bank, Goode House and Olderfleet buildings and Safe Deposit Building
 St David's Cathedral, Hobart
 Government House, Hobart
 Perth Town Hall
 Newington College, founders block
 Church of the Apostles, Launceston

Austria 

 Votivkirche, Vienna, 1856–79
 Rathaus, Vienna, 1872–83
 New Cathedral (Cathedral of the Immaculate Conception), Linz, 1862–1924
 Vier-Evangelisten-Kirche, Arriach,
 Johanneskirche, Klagenfurt
 Evang. Kirche, Techendorf
 Evangelische Kirche im Stadtpark, Villach
 Nikolai-Kirche, Villach
 Filialkirche hl. Stefan, Föderlach (Wernberg)
 Marienkirche, Berndorf, Lower Austria
 Bründlkapelle, Dietmanns
 Sisi Chapel located in the Sievering area of the Viennese district of Döbling near the Vienna Woods
 Saint John the Evangelist church Aigen, Upper Austria
 Pfarrkirche, Bruckmühl, Upper Austria
 Evang. Pfarrkirche A.B., Steyr, Upper Austria
 Pfarrkirche Mariä Himmelfahrt, Mauerkirchen, Upper Austria
 Filialkirche Heiliges Kreuz Friedhof, Münzbach, Upper Austria

Barbados 

 Parliament of Barbados, west-wing completed 1872, east-wing in 1873.

Belgium 
 Maredsous Abbey, 1872–1892
 Loppem Castle, 1856–1869
 Church of Hunnegem, paintings 1856–1869
 Basilica of Our Lady, Dadizele, 1857–1867 
 Sint-Petrus-en-Pauluskerk, Ostend, 1899–1908
 Church of Our Lady of Laeken, Brussels, 1854–1909
 Mesen castle, Lede.

Bosnia and Herzegovina 

 Cathedral of Jesus' Heart, Sarajevo

Brazil 
 Church of Our Lady of Purification, Bom Princípio, 1871
 Sanctuary of Our Lady Mother of Humanity (Caraça), Minas Gerais, 1876
 Basilica of the Immaculate Conception, Rio de Janeiro, 1886
 Cathedral of Our Lady of Exile, Jundiaí, 1890
 Cathedral of Santa Teresa, Caxias do Sul, 1899
 St. Peter of Alcantara Cathedral, Petrópolis, 1884–1969
 Church os Saint Peter, Porto Alegre, 1919
 Catedral of Our Lady of Boa Viagem, Belo Horizonte, 1923
 Church of Santa Rita, Santa Rita do Passa Quatro
 Church of The Holy Sacrament and Santa Teresa, Porto Alegre, 1924
 São Paulo Sé Cathedral (Catedral da Sé de São Paulo), São Paulo, 1912–1967
 Premonstratensian Seminary Chapel, Pirapora do Bom Jesus, 1926
 Sanctuary of Santa Teresinha, Taubaté, 1929
 São João Batista Cathedral (Catedral São João Batista), Santa Cruz do Sul, 1928–1932 
 Church of Our Lady of the Glory, Sinimbu, 1927
 Basilica of Santo Antonio, Santos, 1929
 Basilica of Our Lady of the Rosary, Caieiras, 2006
 Basilica of Our Lady of the Rosary of Fatima, Embu das Artes, São Paulo, 2004

Canada 

 Parliament Hill, Ottawa, Ontario, 1878
 Notre-Dame Basilica, Montreal, Quebec, 1829
 St. James' Cathedral, Toronto, Ontario, 1853
 Cathedral of St. John the Baptist St. John's, Newfoundland, 1847–85
 Church of Our Lady Immaculate, Guelph, Ontario, 1888
 Currie Hall, Royal Military College of Canada, Kingston, Ontario, 1922
 College Building, Saskatoon, Saskatchewan (1913)
 Little Trinity Anglican Church, 1843, Toronto, Ontario – Tudor Gothic revival
 Church of the Holy Trinity (Toronto), 1847, Toronto, Ontario
 St. Dunstan's Basilica 1916, Charlottetown, PEI
 Hart House at the University of Toronto, 1911–1919, Toronto, Ontario
 1 Spadina Crescent, at the University of Toronto, Toronto, Ontario, 1875
 Burwash Hall at Victoria University in the University of Toronto, Toronto, Ontario
 Cathedral of St. John the Baptist, St. John's
 St. Patrick's Church, St. John's
 St. Peter's Cathedral (London), London, Ontario, 1885
 St. Patrick's Basilica, Montreal, Montreal, 1847
 Ottawa Normal School, Ottawa, Ontario, 1874
 St. Patrick's Basilica (Ottawa), Ottawa, Ontario, 1875
 First Baptist Church (Ottawa), Ottawa, Ontario, 1878
 Confederation Building (Ottawa), Ottawa, Ontario, 1931
 Christ Church Cathedral, Montreal
 St. Michael's Basilica, Chatham, New Brunswick
 St. Mary's Basilica (Halifax), Halifax Regional Municipality, Nova Scotia, 1899
 St. Michael's Cathedral, Toronto, Toronto, Ontario, 1845
 Church of the Redeemer (Toronto), Toronto, Ontario, 1879
 St. James Anglican Church, Vancouver, British Columbia
 Bathurst Street Theatre, Toronto, Ontario, 1888
 Bloor Street United Church, Toronto, Ontario, 1890
 Casa Loma, Toronto, Ontario, 1914

Chile 

 Federico Santa María Technical University, Valparaíso 1931
 Church of the Sacred Heart, Valparaíso
 Church of the Twelve Apostles, Valparaíso, 1869
 Vergara Hall (Venetian Gothic), Viña del Mar, 1910

China 

 Church of Our Lady of Mount Carmel, Beijing
 Church of the Saviour, Beijing
 Teng Shih K'ou Congregational Church, Beijing
 Sacred Heart Cathedral, Canton, 1863–1888
 St. Theresa's Cathedral, Changchun
 St. John's Church, Chengdu
 St. Joseph's Cathedral, Chongqing
 Holy Cross Church, Wanzhou District, Chongqing
 Saint Dominic's Cathedral, Fuzhou
 St. John's Cathedral, Hong Kong
 Gospel Church, Jiangyou
 Sacred Heart Cathedral, Jinan
 St. John's Cathedral, Langzhong
 Gospel Church, Mianyang
 Our Lady of Lourdes Church, Mianyang
 Gospel Church, Mianzhu
 Holy Trinity Church, Shanghai
 National Shrine and Minor Basilica of Our Lady of Sheshan, Shanghai
 St. Ignatius Cathedral, Shanghai
 Sacred Heart Cathedral, Shengyang
 All Saints' Church, Tianjin

Croatia 

 Castle Trakošćan, 1886
 Hermann Bollé, Monumental cemetery Mirogoj, Zagreb, 1879–1929
 Hermann Bollé, Zagreb cathedral, 1880-

Costa Rica 
 Iglesia de Coronado, San Jose

Czech Republic 

 Basilica of St Peter and St Paul, Prague
 Completion of St. Vitus Cathedral, Prague, 1870–1929
 Completion of Saint Wenceslas cathedral, Olomouc, 1883–92
 Hluboká Castle

Denmark 

 St. Ansgar's Cathedral, Copenhagen (1840–42)
 University of Copenhagen, Copenhagen, 1835
 Copenhagen University Library, Copenhagen, 1857–61
 St. John's Church, Copenhagen, Nørrebro, Copenhagen, 1861
 St. James's Church, Østerbro, Copenhagen, 1876–78
 Church of Our Lady, Aarhus, 1879–80 
 St. Alban's Church, Copenhagen, 1885–87

Equatorial Guinea 
 St. Elizabeth's Cathedral, Malabo, 1897–1916

Finland 
 St. Henry's Cathedral, Helsinki, 1858–1860
 Ritarihuone, Helsinki, 1862
 Heinävesi Church, Heinävesi, 1890–1891
 St. John's Church, Helsinki, 1888–1893
 Mikkeli Cathedral, Mikkeli, 1896–1897
 Joensuu church, Joensuu, 1903

France 

 Temple Saint-Étienne, Mulhouse
 Basilica of St. Clotilde, Paris
 Église Saint-Ambroise, Paris
 Église Saint-Georges, Lyon
 Jesuit Church, Molsheim
 St. Paul's Church, Strasbourg
 Basilica of the Sanctuary of Our Lady of Lourdes

Germany 
 Nauener Tor, Potsdam, 1755
 Gothic House, Dessau-Wörlitz Garden Realm, 1774 
 Friedrichswerdersche Kirche, Berlin, 1824–30
 Castle in Kamenz (now Kamieniec Ząbkowicki in Poland), 1838–65 
 Burg Hohenzollern, 1850–67
 Completion of Cologne Cathedral, 1842–80
 New Town Hall, Munich, 1867–1909
 St. Agnes, Cologne, 1896–1901

Hungary 
 Sacred Heart Church, Kőszeg
 Hungarian Parliament Building, Budapest
 Matthias Church, Budapest

India 
 San Thome Basilica, Chennai, India
 St Paul Cathedral, Kolkata, India
 Kolkata High Court, Kolkata, India
 Mutiny Memorial, New Delhi, India
 St. Stephen's Church, New Delhi, India
 Our Lady of Ransom Church, Kanyakumari, India
 Cathedral of the Holy Name, Mumbai, India
  Marthandam CSI Church, Martandam, India
 Mount Mary Church, Bandra, Mumbai, India
 Chhatrapati Shivaji Terminus, Mumbai, India
 University of Mumbai, Mumbai, India
 Bombay High Court, Mumbai, India
 Wilson College, Mumbai, India
 David Sassoon Library, Mumbai, India
 St. Philomena's Church, Mysore, India
Medak Cathedral. Medak. (Telangana). (India)

Indonesia 

 Church of our lady Assumption, Jakarta, Indonesia (Locally known as Gereja Katedral Jakarta)
 Ursula Chapel, Jakarta, Indonesia
 Church of the birth of our Lady Mary, Surabaya, Indonesia
 St. Peter's Church, Bandung, Indonesia
 St. Joseph's Church, Semarang, Indonesia
 St. Fransiskus Chapel, Semarang, Indonesia (located at Ordo St. Fransiskus (OSF) Cloister)
 St. Mary the Virgin Church, Bogor, Indonesia
 Regina Pacis Chapel, Bogor, Indonesia
 Sacred Heart of Jesus Church, Malang, Indonesia (Locally known as Gereja Kayutangan)
 Sayidan Church, Yogyakarta, Indonesia

Ireland 
 St John's Cathedral, County Limerick, 1861
 St. Eunan's Cathedral, Letterkenny, County Donegal,
 Saint Finbarre's Cathedral, Cork, 1870
 Saints Peter and Paul's Church, Cork, 1866
 St Mary's Cathedral, Killarney, County Kerry, 1842–55
 St. Aidan's Cathedral, Enniscorthy, County Wexford, 1843
 St Mary's Cathedral, Tuam, County Galway, 1878
 St. Mary's Cathedral, Kilkenny, County, Kilkenny, 1857

Italy

Liguria 
 Castello d'Albertis, Genoa.
 Chiesa di San Teodoro, Genoa, 1870
 chiesa protestante di Genova, Genoa.
 chiesa anglicana All Saints Church, Bordighera, in the Province of Imperia.
 chiesa di Santo Spirito e Concezione, Zinola/Savona, 1873

Piedmont 
 Castello di Pollenzo, Brà (near Cuneo), Piedmont.
 Chiesa di Santa Rita, Turin, early 20th century.
 Borgo Medioevale, Turin.
 Tempio Valdese, Turin, 1851–53

Veneto 
 Caffè Pedrocchi (or Pedrocchino), Padua, mixed parts of gothic and classical styles.
 Molino Stucky, Venice.
 chiesa di San Giovanni Battista, San Fior, in the Province of Treviso, 1906–1930
 Palazzetto Stern, Venice.
 Villa Herriot, Venice.
 Casa dei Tre Oci, Venice.

Trieste 
 Chiesa Evangelico Luterana, Trieste, 1871–74
 Notre Dame de Sion, Trieste, 1900

Tuscany 
 Florence Cathedral, the facade only.
 Chiesa del Sacro Cuore (Livorno), Livorno (Leghorn), 1915
 Palazzo Aldobrandeschi, Grosseto, 1903
 chiesa Valdese, Florence.
 chiesa Episcopale Americana di Saint James, Florence, early 20th century.
 Tempio della Congregazione Olandese Alemanna, Livorno, 1862–1864

Lazio 
 Chiesa di Santa Maria del Rosario in Prati, Rome, 1912–16
 Church of Sacro Cuore del Suffragio, Rome, 1917
 chiesa del Sacro Cuore, Grottaferrata, in the Province of Rome, 1918–1928
 Chiesa Anglicana Episcopale di San Paolo entro le Mura, Rome
 Chiesa di Ognissanti (chiesa anglicana di Roma), Rome, 1882

Molise 
 Santuario dell'Addolorata, Castelpetroso, 1890–1975

Campania 
 Chiesa di Santa Maria stella del mare, Naples, early 20th century.
 Castello Aselmeyer, Naples.
 Anglican Church of Naples, Naples, 1861–1865
 Chiesa Luterana, Naples, 1864

Sardinia 
 City Hall (Cagliari), Cagliari, 1899

Sicily 
 Chiesa di Santa Maria della Guardia, Catania, 1880
 Chiesa Anglicana di Palermo, Palermo, 1875

Japan 
 Ōura Church, Nagasaki

Korea 
 Cathedral Church of the Virgin Mary of the Immaculate Conception, Myeongdong
 Chunghyeon Church, Seoul

Lithuania 

 Beržėnai Manor
 Belltower of the Church of St. Anne in Vilnius
 Chapel in Rasos Cemetery
 Church of the Ascension of Christ in Kupiškis
 Church of the Assumption of the Virgin Mary in Palanga
 Church of the Assumption of the Blessed Virgin Mary in Salantai
 Church of the Birth of the Blessed Virgin Mary in Nemunaitis
 Church of the Blessed Virgin Mary of the Scapular in Druskininkai
 Church of St. Anne in Akmenė
 Church of St. Anthony of Padua in Birštonas
 Church of St. Casimir in Kamajai
 Church of St. James the Apostle in Švėkšna
 Church of St. John the Baptist in Ramygala
 Church of St. Joseph in Karvis
 Church of St. George in Vilkija
 Church of the Name of Blessed Virgin Mary in Sasnava
 Church of the Holy Trinity in Gruzdžiai
 Church of the Holy Trinity in Jurbarkas
 Church of the Holy Trinity in Pabiržė
 Church of the Holy Trinity in Tverečius
 Church of St. Matthias in Rokiškis
 Church of St. Matthew the Apostle in Anykščiai
 Church of St. Stanislaus the Bishop in Kazitiškis
 Evangelical Lutheran Church in Juodkrantė
 Evangelical Lutheran Church in Nida
 Evangelical Lutheran Church in Šilutė
 Lentvaris Manor
 Paliesiai Manor
 Raduškevičius Palace
 Raudone Castle
 Tyszkiewicz family Mausoleum and Chapel in Kretinga

Malaysia 
 St Michael's Institution, Ipoh, Malaysia
 St. Xavier Church, Malacca, Malaysia
 Holy Rosary Church, Kuala Lumpur, Malaysia

Mexico 
 Chapultepec Castle, Mexico City
 Cathedral of Our Lady of Guadalupe, Zamora, Michoacán
 Mexico City Metropolitan Cathedral
 Palacio de Correos de Mexico
 La Parroquia Church of St. Michael the Archangel, San Miguel de Allende
 Templo Expiatorio del Santísimo Sacramento, Jalisco
 Templo Expiatorio del Sagrado Corazón de Jesús, León, Guanajuato
 Parroquia de San Jose Obrero, Arandas Jalisco

Myanmar 
 St. Mary Cathedral, Yangon, Myanmar
 Holy Trinity Cathedral, Yangon, Myanmar
 St. Joseph Church, Mandalay, Myanmar

Netherlands 
 
 City Hall of Tilburg, Tilburg
 Heuvelse kerk, Tilburg
 Valkenburg railway station, Valkenburg
 Saint Boniface church, Leeuwarden, Leeuwarden
 St. Joseph Cathedral, Groningen, Groningen
 De Krijtberg, Amsterdam
 St. Willibrord's Church, Utrecht, Utrecht
 Saint Paul's Church, Vaals, Vaals
 De Haar Castle, Utrecht

New Zealand 
 Canterbury Museum, Christchurch. (Benjamin Mountfort architect)
 Christchurch Arts Centre, Christchurch (Mountfort)
 Christchurch Cathedral, Christchurch (George Gilbert Scott and Mountfort)
 Canterbury Provincial Council Buildings, Christchurch (Mountfort)
 Christ's College, Christchurch, Christchurch
 Victoria Clock Tower, Christchurch (Mountfort)
 Dunedin Town Hall, Dunedin, 1878–1880. (Robert Lawson)
 First Church, Dunedin 1867–1873. (Lawson)
 Knox Church, Dunedin 1874-1876.(Lawson)
 Larnach Castle, Dunedin, 1867–1887. (Lawson)
 Old St. Paul's, Wellington (Frederick Thatcher)
 St. Joseph's Cathedral, Dunedin, 1879-1886.(Francis Petre)
 Otago Boys' High School, Dunedin 1883–1885. (Lawson)
 Seacliff Lunatic Asylum, Dunedin, 1884–1887. (Lawson)
 University of Otago Clocktower complex, Dunedin, 1878–1922. (Maxwell Bury)
 University of Otago Registry Building, Dunedin, 1879–1922. (Bury)
 Lyttelton Timeball Station, Lyttelton. (Thomas Cane)

Norway 

 Oscarshall, Oslo, 1847–1852
 Sagene Church, Oslo, 1891
 Tromsø Cathedral, in wood, Tromsø, Norway, 1861

Pakistan 
 Government College University, Lahore, Pakistan
 Cathedral Church of the Resurrection, Lahore, Pakistan
 St. Patrick Cathedral, Karachi, Pakistan
 St Andrew's Church, Karachi, Pakistan

Philippines 
 San Sebastian Church, Manila, 1891
 St. Anne's Parish Church / Molo Church, Iloilo, 1795
 Montserrat Abbey San Beda University, Manila, 1926
 Archdiocesan Shrine of Espiritu Santo, Santa Cruz, Manila, 1932
 Ellinwood Malate Church, Malate, Manila, 1936
 Manila Central United Methodist Church, Ermita, Manila, 1937
 Iglesia ni Cristo Lokal ng Washington, Sampaloc, Manila, 1948
 Knox United Methodist Church, Santa Cruz, Manila, 1953

Poland 
 Gothic House in Puławy, 1800–1809
 Potocki mausoleum located at the Wilanów Palace, 1823–1826
 Lublin Castle, 1824–1826
 Krasiński Palace in Opinogóra Górna, 1828–1843
 Kórnik Castle, 1843–1861
 Blessed Bronisława Chapel in Kraków, 1856–1861
 Collegium Novum of the Jagiellonian University in Kraków, 1873–1887
 Karl Scheibler's Chapel in Łódź, 1885–1888
 Cathedral in Siedlce, 1906–1912
 Temple of Mercy and Charity in Płock, 1911–1914

Russia 

 Gothic Chapel, Peterhof
 Chesme Church (1780), St Petersburg
 Tsaritsyno Palace, Moscow
 Nikolskaya tower of Moscow Kremlin, Moscow
 St. Mary Cathedral, Moscow
 St. Andrew's Anglican Church (1884)
 TsUM, Moscow

Singapore 
 St Andrew's Cathedral on North Bridge Road, Singapore
 Church of the Nativity of the Blessed Virgin Mary on Serangoon, Singapore

Spain 
 Astorga Episcopal Palace, Astorga
 Facade and spire of Cathedral of Santa Eulalia, Barcelona
 Temple Expiatori del Sagrat Cor, on Tibidabo hill, Barcelona
 Gothic Quarter, Barcelona
 Butrón Castle
 Sobrellano Palace, Comillas
 Casa de los Botines, León
 Cathedral of San Cristóbal de La Laguna, San Cristóbal de La Laguna
 Anglican Cathedral of the Redeemer, Madrid
 All Saints' Church, Puerto de la Cruz
 San Sebastián Cathedral
 Cathedral of María Inmaculada of Vitoria

Sweden

Neo gothic buildings erected during 19th or 20th century 
 St. John's Church, Stockholm
 St. Peter and St. Sigfrids Anglican church, Stockholm
 Gustavus Adolphus church, Stockholm
 Oscar church, Stockholm
 St. George's Greek orthodox cathedral, Stockholm
 Nacka church, Nacka, Stockholm
 Gustavsberg church, Gustavsberg, Stockholm
 Taxinge church, Taxinge
 Matthew's church, Norrköping
 Oscar Fredrik's church, Gothenburg
 Örgryte new church , Gothenburg
 St. John church, Gothenburg
 St. Andrew's Anglican church, Gothenburg
 Gustavus Adolphus's church, Borås
 Trollhättan church, Trollhättan
 Smögen church, Smögen
 Lysekil church, Lysekil
 Rudbeck school, Örebro
 Olaus Petri church, Örebro
 Åtvid new church, Åtvidaberg
 Kristinehamn church, Kristinehamn
 Luleå cathedral, Luleå
 Umeå city church, Umeå
 Gustavus Adolphus's church, Sundsvall
 Oviken new church, Oviken
 Church of all saints, Lund
 the University Library, Lund
 Cathedral School, Lund
 Norra Nöbbelöv church, Lund
 Eslöv church, Eslöv
 Svedala church, Svedala
 Billinge church, Billinge
 Källstorp church, Källstorp
 Asmundtorp church, Asmundtorp
 Nosaby church, Nosaby
 Österlöv Church, Österlöv
 Östra Klagstorp church, Östra Klagstorp
 Sofia church, Jönköping
 Arlöv church, Arlöv, Malmö
 Bunkeflo church, Bunkeflo, Malmö
 Limhamn church, Limhamn, Malmö
 Gustavus Adolphus's church, Helsingborg
 Helsingborg court house, Helsingborg
 Gossläroverket (Grammar School for boys), Helsingborg

Medieval and other buildings influenced by neo gothic renovation 
 St. Nicolai church, Trelleborg
 Floda church, Flodafors
 Uppsala cathedral, Uppsala
 Skara Cathedral, Skara
 Linköping Cathedral, Linköping
 St. Nicolai church, Örebro
 Klara church, Stockholm
 Riddarholmen church, Stockholm
 Malmö court house, Malmö

Tanzania 

 St. Joseph's Cathedral, Dar es Salaam

Ukraine 
 St. Nicholas Roman Catholic Church, Kyiv
 Cathedral of the Assumption of the Blessed Virgin Mary, Kharkiv
 Church of Sts. Olha and Elizabeth, Lviv

United Kingdom

England 
 Albert Memorial, London, 1872
 All Saints' Church, Daresbury, Cheshire, 1870s, the tower is medieval
 All Saints Church, Leamington Spa, Warwickshire, 1843
 All Saints Church, Margaret Street, London
 Bristol Cathedral, Bristol, the nave and west front
 Broadway Theatre, Catford, London, 1928–32
 Charterhouse School, Godalming, Surrey
 Church of St Mary the Virgin, Reculver, Kent, 1876–78
 Downside Abbey, Somerset, c.1882–1925
 33-35 Eastcheap, City of London, 1868
 Fonthill Abbey, Wiltshire, 1795–1813 (no longer survives)
 Guildford Cathedral, Guildford
 John Rylands Library, Manchester, 1890–1900
 Keble College, Oxford, 1870
 Liverpool Cathedral, Liverpool
 Manchester Town Hall, Manchester, 1877
 The Maughan Library, City of London, 1851–1858
 Northampton Guildhall
 Palace of Westminster (Houses of Parliament), London, begun in 1840
 Royal Chapel of All Saints, Windsor Great Park, Berkshire, remodelled in 1866
 Royal Courts of Justice, London
 St. Chad's Cathedral, Birmingham
 St James the Less, Pimlico, London
 St Oswald's Church, Backford, Cheshire, the nave 1870s, the tower and chancel are medieval
 St Walburge's Church, Preston
 St Pancras railway station, London, 1868
 South London Theatre, London
 Tower Bridge, London
 Truro Cathedral, Cornwall
 Tyntesfield, Somerset, 1863
 Southwark Cathedral, Southwark, London, the nave
 Strawberry Hill, London, begun in 1749
 Oxford University Museum of Natural History, Oxford
 Woodchester Mansion, Gloucestershire, c.1858–1873
 Wills Memorial Building at the University of Bristol, Bristol, 1915–1925
 St John's Church, Warminster

Northern Ireland

Scotland 
 Barclay Church, Edinburgh, Scotland, 1862–1864
 St Mary's Cathedral, Edinburgh (Episcopal), from 1874
 Scott Monument, Edinburgh, Scotland, begun in 1841
 Gilbert Scott Building, University of Glasgow campus, Glasgow, Scotland, (the second largest example of Gothic Revival architecture in the British Isles), 1870
 Kelvinside Hillhead Parish Church, Observatory Road/Huntly Gardens, West End, Glasgow. Opened 1876. Based on the famous Sainte Chapelle, Paris
 Wallace Monument

Wales 

 Hawarden Castle (18th century), Hawarden
 Gwrych Castle, Abergele, 1819
 Penrhyn Castle, Gwynedd, 1820–45
 Cyfarthfa Castle, Merthyr Tydfil, 1824
 Treberfydd, near Brecon, 1847−50
 Bodelwyddan Castle, Bodelwyddan, Denbighshire, 1850s, with further alterations in the 1880s
 Hafodunos, near Llangernyw, 1861–6
 Cardiff Castle, Glamorgan, 1866–9
 Castell Coch, Glamorgan, 1871

United States

Alabama 
 Lanier High School Lanier High School (Montgomery, Alabama), Montgomery, Alabama

California 
 Hearst Castle, San Simeon, California
 Cathedral Building, Oakland, California, 1914
 Grace Cathedral, San Francisco, 1928–1964.
 St. Dominic's Roman Catholic Church, San Francisco, 1928
 All Saints Episcopal Church (Pasadena, California), church 1926, rectory 1931.
 First Congregational Church of Los Angeles, Los Angeles, California 90020, 1931

Connecticut 
 Yale University, New Haven, Connecticut
 Harkness Tower, 1917–21
 Hall of Graduate Studies, Yale Law School
 Payne Whitney Gymnasium
 Residential colleges
 Sterling Memorial Library

Florida 
 Several buildings on the University of Florida campus, Gainesville, Florida

Georgia 
 Congregation Mickve Israel, Savannah, Georgia, 1876–78. A rare example of a Gothic revival synagogue.

Illinois 
 Tribune Tower, Chicago, Illinois, completed in 1925
 University of Chicago
 Rockefeller Chapel
 other campus buildings

Indiana 
 Basilica of the Sacred Heart, Notre Dame, Indiana, 1882

Louisiana 
 Christ Church Cathedral, New Orleans, New Orleans, Louisiana, 1886.
 Old Louisiana State Capitol, Baton Rouge, Louisiana, 1849.
 St. Patrick's Church (New Orleans, Louisiana), New Orleans, Louisiana, 1837.

Maryland 
 The Baltimore City College (public high school), Baltimore, Maryland, founded 1839, erected 1926–1928, third oldest public high school in America, nicknamed "The Castle on the Hill", at 33rd Street and The Alameda.

Massachusetts 
 Boston College, Boston, Massachusetts
 Bapst Library, 1908
 Gasson Tower

Michigan 
 Woodward Avenue Presbyterian Church, Detroit, Michigan, 1911

Mississippi 
 St. Mary's Episcopal Chapel in Adams County, Mississippi, 1837

Missouri 
 Brookings Hall and several buildings on the Washington University in St. Louis campus
 St. Francis de Sales Church (St. Louis, Missouri), the second largest church in the Roman Catholic Archdiocese of St. Louis

New Jersey 
 Cathedral Basilica of the Sacred Heart (Newark, New Jersey) 1954
 Princeton University, Princeton, New Jersey
 Princeton University Chapel, 1925–1928
 Princeton University Graduate College
 Whitman College House
 Several buildings on the Seton Hall University campus, South Orange, New Jersey
 The Willows at Fosterfields, the Morristown mansion built for Joseph Warren Revere, 1854

New York 
 Fonthill Castle and the Administration Building of the College of Mount St. Vincent, the Bronx, 1852 and 1859
 American Museum of Natural History, Manhattan, 1877
 Saint Ignatius of Antioch Episcopal Church, Manhattan, 1902
 St. Patrick's Cathedral, Manhattan, 1858–78
 Woolworth Building, Manhattan, 1910–13
 Trinity and United States Realty Buildings, Manhattan, 1907
 New York Life Insurance Building, Manhattan, 1928
 Liberty Tower, Manhattan, 1909
 Public School 166 in Manhattan, New York City, 1898
 McGraw Tower, Uris Library, Willard Straight Hall, and other buildings on the Cornell University campus in Ithaca, New York.
 Several buildings of the Fordham University campus, the Bronx, including structures as recently constructed as 2000.
 The Thompson Memorial Library at Vassar College in Poughkeepsie, NY, 1905.
 Several buildings on the City College of New York campus, Manhattan
 Most of the buildings on the West Point campus, most famously the West Point Cadet Chapel

North Carolina 
 Duke Chapel and the main quadrangle of the West Campus of Duke University, Durham, North Carolina, 1930–35
 High Point Central High School, (High Point, North Carolina)

Ohio 
 Several buildings on the University of Toledo campus, Toledo, Ohio
 St. John's Episcopal Church (Cleveland, Ohio) 1836, the oldest consecrated building in Cuyahoga County, Ohio
 Trinity Cathedral, Cleveland
 Forest Lawn Memorial Park Youngstown, Ohio
 Jones Hall at Youngstown State University, Youngstown, Ohio 
 Saint John's Episcopal Church, Youngstown, Ohio

Pennsylvania 

 Alumni Memorial Building, Lehigh University, Bethlehem, 1925
 Bryn Athyn Cathedral, Bryn Athyn, 1913–19
 Several buildings on the Bryn Mawr College campus, Bryn Mawr
 Church of the Advocate, Philadelphia, 1892–97
 East Liberty Presbyterian Church, Pittsburgh, 1932–35
 Several buildings on the Grove City College campus, Grove City, Pennsylvania
 PPG Place, Pittsburgh, Pennsylvania, 1984
 Saint Peter's Episcopal Church, Pittsburgh, Pennsylvania. Built 1851, moved and re-constructed 1901, destroyed (date needed)
 University of Pennsylvania, Philadelphia
 College Hall, 1872
 Houston Hall, 1894–96, 1936
 Irvine Auditorium, 1926–29
 Quadrangle Dormitories, 1895–1912, 1920s, 1950s
 University of Pittsburgh, Pittsburgh
 Cathedral of Learning, 1926–37
 Heinz Chapel, 1933–38
 Stephen Foster Memorial, 1935–37
 Clapp Hall, 1956

Tennessee 
 Several buildings on the Rhodes College campus, Memphis, Tennessee
 St. Mary's Episcopal Cathedral in Memphis, Tennessee, 1898–1926

Texas 
St. Patrick Cathedral, Fort Worth, Texas, 1888

Utah 
 Salt Lake Temple, Salt Lake City, Utah, 1896

Virginia 
 St. Paul's Episcopal Church (Alexandria, Virginia), 1818, designed by Benjamin Latrobe
 Several buildings on the University of Richmond campus, Richmond, Virginia, 1937

Washington 
 Suzzallo Library and several buildings on the University of Washington campus, Seattle, Washington

Washington, D.C. 
 Oak Hill Cemetery Chapel, Washington, D.C., designed by James Renwick, Jr. in 1850
 Washington National Cathedral, Washington, D.C., 1907–90

Wyoming 
 Natrona County High School, Casper, Wyoming, 1924

Vietnam 
 Saigon Notre-Dame Basilica, Ho Chi Minh City, Vietnam
 St. Joseph Cathedral, Hanoi, Vietnam
 Nha Trang Cathedral, Nha Trang, Vietnam

References 

Gothic Revival